"I Got the Hook Up" is the lead single released from the I Got the Hook Up soundtrack. It featured vocals from the Sons of Funk and was produced by Beats by the Pound member KLC and Sons Of Funk. The single was released through Priority Records and Master P's No Limit Records.

Commercial performance
Released shortly after Master P's smash hit "Make 'Em Say Uhh!", "I Got the Hook Up" matched that song's peak position of 16, while also reaching the number 1 spot on the Hot Rap Singles chart. The single was certified gold by the Recording Industry Association of America on June 15, 1998, his third and final single to accomplish that feat. It sold 700,000 copies.

Single track listing

CD
"I Got the Hook Up" (Album Version)- 4:18
"I Got the Hook Up" (Instrumental Version)- 4:17
"I Got the Hook Up" (R&B Mix)- 4:10
"From What I Was Told"- 3:27

Charts and certifications

Weekly charts

Year-end charts

Certifications

|}

References

1998 singles
1998 songs
Master P songs